Papua New Guinea sent a delegation to compete at the 2008 Summer Paralympics in Beijing. The country was represented by two athletes, Francis Kompaon and Joyleen Jeffrey, both competing in track and field.  The country had requested wildcard entries, but the request was turned down by the Beijing Paralympic organisers.

Papua New Guinea was making its return to the Paralympics, having competed in 2000 but not in 2004.

Medallists
Francis Kompaon won Papua New Guinea's first ever Paralympic or Olympic medal.  It was the country's only medal of the Games.

Athletics

See also
2008 Summer Paralympics
Papua New Guinea at the Paralympics
Papua New Guinea at the 2008 Summer Olympics

References

External links
Beijing 2008 Paralympic Games Official Site
International Paralympic Committee

Nations at the 2008 Summer Paralympics
2008
Paralympics